The Dragon Academy was a former progressive private middle and high school located in Toronto, Ontario. It was founded by Dr. Meg Fox in the year 2000 and closed after the 2019-2020 school year, presumably due to pressures from the COVID-19 pandemic.

References

Private schools in Toronto
Educational institutions established in 2001
2001 establishments in Ontario